Alexey Bychenok (born 31 July 1986) is a Russian male cross-country skier and biathlete who is also engaged with the Paralympic athletics. He represented Russia at the 2014 Winter Paralympics and competed in the biathlon events. Alexey claimed his first Paralympic medal for Russia after claiming a silver medal in the men's middle sitting event during the 2014 Winter Paralympics.

Biography 
Alexey Bychenok was born on 31 July 1986 in Temirtau, Russia (now situated in Kazakhstan). He had an injury that he sustained in 1995 caused his legs to be amputated. He took the sport of cross-country skiing in 2010.

Career 
Alexey Bychenok competed in the 2014 Winter Paralympics, which was his maiden Paralympic event and took part only in the biathlon events despite being a more specialised cross-country skier. He maximised the opportunity to represent his country in the 2014 Winter Paralympics which was held in his home soil and managed to clinch a silver medal in the 12.5 km middle sitting category.

He decided to compete in the Paralympic athletics as well in addition to Paralympic Nordic skiing and competed in few international Athletics Championships including the 2015 London Marathon, 2015 IPC Athletics World Championships. He claimed a bronze medal in the men's 200m T54 event as a part of the 2015 IPC Athletics World Championships.

Alexey Bychenok was originally named in Russian squad for the 2016 Summer Paralympics but the team was disqualified to compete in the Olympics and Paralympics mainly due to the Doping scandal. He was not selected to compete for Neutral Paralympic Athletes at the 2018 Winter Paralympics at the 2018 Winter Paralympics as Russia was banned from competing from both 2018 Winter Olympics and in the 2018 Winter Paralympics, though he was considered for selection earlier by the Russian Paralympic Committee.

References 

1986 births
Living people
Russian male sprinters
Russian male marathon runners
Russian male cross-country skiers
Russian male biathletes
Biathletes at the 2014 Winter Paralympics
Paralympic biathletes of Russia
Paralympic silver medalists for Russia
Medalists at the 2014 Winter Paralympics
People from Temirtau
Medalists at the World Para Athletics Championships
Medalists at the World Para Athletics European Championships
Paralympic medalists in biathlon
20th-century Russian people
21st-century Russian people